This list of poker playing card nicknames has some nicknames for the playing cards in a 52-card deck, as used in poker.

Poker hand nicknames
The following sets of playing cards can be referred to by the corresponding names in card games that include sets of three or more cards, particularly 3 and 5 card draw, Texas Hold 'em and Omaha Hold 'em. The nicknames would often be used by players when revealing their hands, or by spectators and commentators watching the game. With TV and web broadcasting of Poker tournaments, nicknames became much more popular all over the world.

Texas hold 'em pocket card nicknames
The following is a list of nicknames for pairs of two playing cards, usually hole cards, used in poker derivatives such as Texas hold 'em and Omaha hold 'em poker. These nicknames are usually used by the player when announcing their hand or by spectators or commentators who are watching the game.

Ace higher card

King higher card

Queen higher card

Jack higher card

Ten higher card

Nine higher card

Eight higher card

Seven higher card

Six higher card

Five higher card

Four higher card

Three higher card

Pocket Twos

One-eyed royals
The phrase one-eyed royals is jargon referring to the three face cards showing only one eye: the Jack of Spades, Jack of Hearts and King of Diamonds. The faces depicted on these three cards are shown in profile, resulting in only one eye being visible. The variant form "one-eyed Jacks" excludes the King of Diamonds. The cards are also sometimes referred to as "one-eyed Jacks and the Man with the Axe", which relates to the King of Diamonds being the only one to bear an axe instead of a sword. These cards are frequently designated as wildcards in home games of draw poker. Other such phrases include "Suicide King", denoting the King of Hearts bearing a sword through his head, and 'Bedside Queen', denoting the Queen of Spades bearing a staff that resembles a wooden bedpost. The name "Allergic Queen" also refers to the Queens facing away from the flowers they hold.

See also
 List of poker-related topics
 Glossary of poker terms
 Poker-hand rankings

References 

Poker hands
Card game terminology
Poker gameplay and terminology